Nino Surguladze (Georgian: ნინო სურგულაძე; born 12 October 1977 in Tbilisi, Georgia) is a Georgian mezzo-soprano.

Biography

Born in Tbilisi, Surguladze studied singing with Guliko Kariauli at the Tbilisi State Conservatoire. She made her operatic debut as Cuniza in Verdi's Oberto and Zulma in Rossini's L'italiana in Algeri  in Milan in 2002, and has since appeared in many opera houses around the world.

She has appeared in the Italian television film Rigoletto a Mantova (2010) and in the Georgian films Valsi Pechoraze and Metichara. In 2010, she was awarded the Presidential Order of Excellence by Mikhail Saakashvili. In 2018 she appeared in the title role of a video-recorded performance of Bizet's Carmen by the Opéra Royal de Liège.

Surguladze is a founder of the charity foundation Desire Tree, which aims to provide assistance to children in need of medical care.

Operatic repertoire
Bellini
Adalgisa (Norma)

Berlioz
Marguerite (La Damnation de Faust)

Bizet
Carmen (Carmen)

Gounod
Siebel (Faust)

Tchaikovsky
Olga (Eugene Onegin)

Mascagni
Santuzza (Cavalleria rusticana)

Mozart
Dorabella (Così fan tutte)

Verdi 
Amneris (Aida)
Fenena (Nabucco)
Maddalena (Rigoletto)

Discography
 Giuseppe Verdi: Rigoletto. Arthaus, DVD, 2010
 Bizet: Carmen. Dynamic, DVD, 2009
 Sergei Prokofiev: Betrothal in a monastery. Glyndebourne, CD, 2006
 Giuseppe Verdi: Nabucco. Arthaus, DVD, 2006
 Gioacchino Rossini: Moïse et Pharaon. TDK, DVD, 2005
 Shostakovich: Lady Macbeth of Mtsensk. EMI Classics, DVD, 2002

References

External links

 Nino Surguladze at MCdomani (management agency) 
 Nino Surguladze at Operabase (performance schedule)
 

1977 births
Writers from Tbilisi
Operatic mezzo-sopranos
Living people
21st-century women opera singers from Georgia (country)